Nasreddine Akli (born May 10, 1953) is a former Algerian footballer and coach. He holds the Algeria national football team record for goals scored in one match, scoring six goals against South Yemen in the 1973 Palestine Cup of Nations in Libya.

Born in Mouzaia, Akli played for USM Blida, USM Alger and SKAF Khemis Miliana, and coached a number of teams including USM Blida, Paradou AC, WA Boufarik, USMM Hadjout, JSM Chéraga and ESM Koléa.

Career statistics

International

International goals

References

External links
 DZfootball profile
 

1953 births
Algeria international footballers
Algerian football managers
Algerian footballers
USM Alger players
USM Blida players
USM Blida managers
People from Blida Province
Paradou AC managers
Living people
Association football forwards
WA Boufarik managers
21st-century Algerian people